The canton of Saumur is an administrative division of the Maine-et-Loire department, in western France. It was created at the French canton reorganisation which came into effect in March 2015. Its seat is in Saumur.

It consists of the following communes:

Artannes-sur-Thouet 
Distré
Fontevraud-l'Abbaye
Montsoreau
Parnay
Rou-Marson
Saumur
Souzay-Champigny
Turquant
Varrains
Verrie

References

Cantons of Maine-et-Loire